The Pearl High School shooting was a school shooting that occurred on October 1, 1997 at Pearl High School in Pearl, Mississippi, United States. The gunman, 16-year-old 11th grade student Luke Woodham (born February 5, 1981), killed two students and injured seven others at the school after killing his mother at their home earlier that morning.

Shooting
The incident began on the morning of Wednesday, October 1, 1997, when Luke Woodham fatally stabbed and bludgeoned his mother, Mary Ann Woodham, as she prepared for a morning jog.  At his trial, Woodham claimed that he could not remember killing his mother.

Woodham then drove his mother's Toyota Tercel to Pearl High School.  Wearing a trench coat to conceal the rifle he was carrying, Woodham entered the school and gave a manifesto to Justin Sledge, who then hid in the library while the shooting took place. Woodham then fatally shot Lydia Kaye Dew and Christina Menefee, his former girlfriend, then went on to wound seven others.

The school's assistant principal, Joel Myrick, retrieved a .45 caliber semi-automatic pistol from his truck and, spotting Woodham attempting to flee the parking lot after the shooting, shouted for him to stop. Realizing what Woodham was doing, another student used his own vehicle to block Woodham's path, at which point Woodham attempted to get around the obstruction by driving his mother's car onto a grass verge, only to end up getting stuck in the grass. Seizing his opportunity, Myrick ordered Woodham out of the car at gunpoint and detained him until police arrived at the scene.

Religious and esoteric involvement
Less than a week after the shooting, police arrested six other students, charging them with conspiracy to commit murder. Justin Sledge had gone on a local news report and read from the notebooks of writings given to him just before the shooting. Minutes before Woodham started the shooting, he had given the following message to Sledge:

Further examination of the notebooks given to Justin Sledge revealed an account of when he and a friend had tortured his dog Sparkle to death, several months prior to the shooting:

Prior to the shootings, Woodham had met Grant Boyette, another of the six charged with conspiracy to murder, and supposedly accepted an invitation to join a group Boyette had formed and called "the Kroth". During the summer of 1997, the supposed members of the Kroth allegedly made plans to terrorize Pearl High School. The plans ultimately involved Woodham entering the school and opening fire. The indictments claimed that Boyette and Sledge met several times with Woodham to convince him ``that murder was a viable means of accomplishing the purposes and goals of the shared belief system.''

The day after the shooting, Sledge "fanned the community’s fears by pinning a note to the door of the school that said the Kroth’s numbers were diminished but the group was still strong." He then disrupted a prayer vigil held to mourn the dead students, for which he received a suspension from the school district. Sledge currently denies membership in the Kroth and says his comments at the memorial were mischaracterized but still "clearly inappropriate". However, at the time, Sledge went on a local TV news program to read aloud from the manifesto given to him by Woodham. Reading emphatically from Woodham's writings, Sledge declared that, “[Luke] says that the world has shit on him for the final time. He is not spoiled or lazy, for murder is not weak and slow-witted. Murder is gutsy and daring."  
On October 8, 1997, Sledge, Boyette, and the other members of the Kroth were arrested on suspicion of conspiring with Woodham to commit the shooting. During his trial, Woodham claimed to have gotten ideas of committing the murders by being involved with Sledge and Boyette. Woodham admitted to being a Satanist, and claimed that Boyette had invited him to join "The Kroth." He claimed that Boyette had told him he had "potential to do something great," and promised him that he could get his ex-girlfriend back through black magic.

On October 8, 1997, Sledge, Boyette, and the other members of the Kroth were arrested on suspicion of conspiring with Woodham to commit the shooting. During his trial, Woodham claimed to have gotten ideas of committing the murders by being involved with Sledge and Boyette. Woodham admitted to being a Satanist, and claimed that Boyette had invited him to join "The Kroth." He claimed that Boyette had told him he had "potential to do something great," and promised him that he could get his ex-girlfriend back through black magic.

Sledge, who is now an academic specializing in philosophy and religion, argues that the media and police's claims that he was part of a satanic cult lacked evidence, exemplifying the broader Satanic Panic trend of the 1980s and 1990s. 

After his conviction Woodham converted to Christianity, and said the following in a letter written to evangelical minister David Wilkerson:

Trials and incarceration

There were separate trials for the murder of Woodham's mother and the school shooting. Woodham's lawyer argued at both trials that Woodham was insane at the time of the killings. Jurors rejected Woodham's insanity defense at his first trial for the murder of his mother, and he was sentenced to life in prison on June 5, 1998. His second trial took place on June 12, and he was found guilty of two counts of murder and seven counts of attempted murder, with the jurors once again rejecting the insanity defense. He was given two life sentences for the murders and seven 20-year sentences for his attempted murder convictions. He is currently serving three life terms plus an additional 140 years in prison. He will be eligible for parole in 2046, when he is 65 years old.

Conspiracy charges against the members of the Kroth who were minors were dropped by Judge Robert Goza "at the request of District Attorney John Kitchens, who said Mississippi's conspiracy law would make proving the accusations difficult."  Grant Boyette, who was 18 at the time, was convicted and sentenced to the Mississippi State Penitentiary at Parchman boot camp for six months and five years of supervised probation.

Less than three days after his last conviction, Woodham was removed from the Forrest County Jail in Hattiesburg. On June 15, 1998, Woodham entered the Mississippi Department of Corrections (MDOC) system in the Central Mississippi Correctional Facility (CMCF) in Rankin County. While at CMCF Woodham underwent evaluation so he could be assigned to a permanent facility. Several weeks later, he was moved into the Mississippi State Penitentiary (MSP) in Sunflower County. As of 2022 Woodham is incarcerated in Unit 3 of SMCI as MDOC #R4682. His location last changed on November 2, 2022.

Aftermath
The State of Mississippi made it a capital crime if a murder is committed on the property of a school.

In 2003, Sledge pleaded guilty to federal charges of having purchased an illegal and untraceable machine gun online. Sledge's involvement in the shooting was addressed at sentencing. "I think we're dealing with a brilliant mind. I hope we're not dealing with an (sic) Hannibal Lecter," Judge Barbour said of Sledge, to which U.S. Attorney Dunn Lampton replied, "That's what concerns me. He has the ability to manipulate...He was a lot closer to Luke Woodham than he led the court to believe. That's what's disturbing to me." ]

As of 2022, Dr. James Justin Sledge runs the YouTube channel ESOTERICA, and collects donations on Patreon. The FAQ section of his website addresses the Pearl High School shooting.

In 2010, Woodham made a request to Governor of Mississippi, Haley Barbour, asking for clemency; however, his request was rejected.

See also
 List of school shootings in the United States (before 2000)
 List of school-related attacks

References

External links
 
 
 
 Hewitt, Bill. "The Avenger." People. November 3, 1997. Volume 48, No. 18.

School shootings committed by pupils
Crimes involving Satanism or the occult
Matricides
School killings in the United States
History of Rankin County, Mississippi
Animal cruelty incidents
Defensive gun use
Murder in Mississippi
1997 murders in the United States
1997 in Mississippi
Deaths by firearm in Mississippi
1997 mass shootings in the United States
Mass shootings in the United States
Deaths by stabbing in Mississippi
Crimes in Mississippi
Attacks in the United States in 1997
October 1997 events in the United States
Mass shootings in Mississippi
High school shootings in the United States